CU Scarborough is a Higher Education institute owned and governed by Coventry University. CU Scarborough launched in 2015 and currently operates in the North Yorkshire coastal town, Scarborough.

Campus 
The first cohort of students studied classes in Scarborough Spa, before moving into a £14 million purpose-built campus in Scarborough. Facilities include a mock law court.

CU Scarborough is part of the Scarborough £50 million education and sport campus, with the neighbouring Sports Village operated by Everyone Active, offering an Olympic Legacy swimming pool, a four-court sports hall, a multi-activity room, 60-station fitness suite and a community football stadium home to Scarborough Athletic F.C.

Subjects 
CU Scarborough currently offers a diverse range of subjects. Students can study degree programmes, Foundation Years, Access to Higher Education courses or Degree Apprenticeships.

Degree subjects include:

 Adult Nursing
 Business Management & Leadership
 Computing Science
 Counselling: Integrative Theory & Practice
 Cyber Security
 Early Childhood Development & Learning
 Electro-Mechanical Engineering 
 Health & Social Care
 Law & Practice
 Policing
 Primary Education & Teaching Studies
 Public Health & Community Studies

Foundation Year subjects include:

 Business
 Engineering
 Health & Social Care

Access to Higher Education courses are available in a range of courses, allowing people to re-enter education after time away, without traditional qualifications.

 Health & Human Sciences 
 Social Sciences

Graduation 
In 2018, students at CU Scarborough celebrated their first graduation ceremony at an event held in the Grand Hall, at Scarborough Spa. Sir Alan Ayckbourn, CBE, received an Honorary Doctor of Letters (Hon DLitt) in recognition of his impact on theatre in Scarborough and his contributions to the creative industries.

References 

Scar
Education in Scarborough, North Yorkshire
2015 establishments in the United Kingdom